Hindu Love Gods may refer to:
Kamadeva and Rati
Hindu Love Gods (band)
Hindu Love Gods (album), eponymous album of recorded music